Joseph Kraft (September 4, 1924 – January 10, 1986) was an American journalist.

Career
Kraft began his career in journalism at the age of 14 where he worked as a stringer covering high school sports for the New York World-Telegram. Kraft worked for the Los Angeles Times and Los Angeles Syndicate since July 1980 where he covered foreign affairs and national security. After working at The Washington Post and The New York Times in the 1950s, he became a speechwriter for 1960 Presidential candidate John F. Kennedy. His work landed him on the master list of Nixon political opponents. He served as one of three panelists for the third and final debate, held at Phi Beta Kappa Memorial Hall at the College of William & Mary, in the 1976 presidential election. Kraft was viewed as one of America's foremost analysts of domestic and international affairs. His syndicated column ran in over 200 papers.

Education
Kraft was a graduate of Columbia University. He also attended the Institute for Advanced Study at Princeton and the Sorbonne.

Personal life
Kraft died on January 10, 1986, by heart failure at the age of 61. His brother, Gilman Kraft, is a publisher who was the former owner of Playbill.

Publications
Kraft was the author of four books:
The Struggle for Algeria (1961)
The Grand Design (1962)
Profiles in Power (1966)
The Chinese Difference (1973)

He also wrote an extraordinary journalistic account of the explosion of Mexico's debt crisis in 1982:
The Mexican Rescue (1984)

References

Sources
McFadden, Robert D. (January 11, 1986). Joseph Kraft, Capital Columnist Whose Work Ran in 200 Papers. The New York Times
Rosenblatt, Roger (Jan. 27, 1986). The Death of a Columnist. Time magazine
Staff report (February 3, 1986). Joseph Kraft, 1924–1986. (obituary). The New Republic

1924 births
1986 deaths
American male journalists
Journalists from New York City
Columbia College (New York) alumni
Ethical Culture Fieldston School alumni
20th-century American writers
20th-century American journalists
20th-century American male writers
American expatriates in France